is an anime series created by Yoshihiko Inamoto. It is about a group of people who are reincarnations of ancient Inca warriors who have returned to re-enact a civil war that resulted in the fall of the Inca Empire.

Plot
Miura Kyoji, a dedicated kendo student, discovers that his instructor, Tate Masanari, is a reincarnated Inca warrior named Yawaru who wishes to destroy the world to purify it. Kyoji himself is the warrior Bilka, who foiled Yawaru's plans in their previous lives. As Yawaru gathers other awakened spirits such as from Kyoji's friends & enemies to give him ever more power, Kyoji faces conflicting loyalties; he must decide if he is merely a vessel for the reincarnated soul, destined to fulfill a role given to him and destroy a person he liked and respected in order to save the world, or if he is a free individual who can bring Masanari to his senses and break the cycle of rebirth and human possession. Kyoji gathers his girlfriend; Tate's ex-fiancé, Yuka Kiritake, his best friend Dan Takuma, & Dan's friend Seino Keita to stop Tate's/Yawaru's mission, while Tate gathers Kyoji's best friend, Daimon, Kyoji & Dan's rival, Shiogami, Shiogami's half-sister, Tatsuko, and Garos, another reborn God to stop Kyoji, Yuka, Dan & Seino's interference. They all travel to Asuka to release or prevent Iryatesse, a source of power & energy for all that lives on Earth. Tate/Yawaru plans to release Iryatesse in order to create his ideal world, which will also cause the deaths of millions. Kyoji/Bilka & his friends plan to stop him, so that they can protect their futures.

Episodes list

Popular culture
Two clips from episode 3 of Nazca are used in the opening titles of the American sitcom Malcolm in the Middle.

References

External links
 Review from EX
 

1998 anime television series debuts
1998 manga
Adventure anime and manga
Anime with original screenplays
Fantasy anime and manga
Genco
Geneon USA
Kadokawa Shoten manga
NBCUniversal Entertainment Japan
Shōnen manga
TV Tokyo original programming